Drosera sessilifolia is a species in the carnivorous plant genus Drosera that is native to Brazil, Guyana, and Venezuela and grows in sandy or gravelly soils in seasonal seepages where a thin film of water collects. It produces a rosette of small, wedge-shaped to round carnivorous leaves that are usually yellowish but become redder with age. Inflorescences produce pink-lilac flowers. It has a diploid chromosome number of 2n = 20.

Drosera sessilifolia was first described by Augustin Saint-Hilaire in 1824 after it was discovered in the western end of the Brazilian state Minas Gerais near the São Francisco River. George Bentham then described D. dentata from Guyana, which Ludwig Diels reduced to synonymy with D. sessilifolia in his 1906 monograph on the Droseraceae. It is closely related to D. burmannii, the only other species in subgenus Thelocalyx, though D. burmannii is native to Australia and Southeast Asia.

See also 
List of Drosera species

References 

sessilifolia
Carnivorous plants of South America
Flora of Brazil
Flora of Guyana
Flora of Venezuela
Guayana Highlands
Plants described in 1824